Abraxas punctifera is a species of moth belonging to the family Geometridae. It was described by Francis Walker in 1865. It is known from the Aru Islands of Indonesia.

References

Abraxini
Moths of Indonesia
Moths described in 1865